Anastasios "Tasos" Bakasetas (born 28 June 1993) is a Greek professional footballer who plays as an attacking midfielder and occasionally as a forward, for Turkish Süper Lig club Trabzonspor and captains the Greece national team.

Club career

Asteras Tripolis
Bakasetas came through the youth system at Asteras Tripolis, and was promoted to the first team in the 2010–11 Superleague season, for which he was assigned squad number 12. He made five league appearances for the club in this season, four of which were as a substitute, and two in the Greek Cup. His Super League debut was in a starting position against Xanthi on 28 November 2010, a match Asteras Tripolis lost 2–1 despite taking the lead.

In the Greek Cup, he made his first start in a 1–0 defeat to Olympiacos on 22 December 2010.  His final appearance for Asteras Tripolis in the 2010–11 season came as a second-half substitute in a 3–0 league defeat against AEK Athens on 16 January 2011.

Loan to Thrasyvoulos
At the end of January 2011, he went on loan to Thrasyvoulos in the second tier  Greek Football League. He played ten league games for Thrasyvolous, scoring his first senior goal against Ethnikos Asteras in a 2–0 win on 28 February 2011. He returned to Asteras Tripoli at the end of the season in July 2011.

Loan to Aris
At the end of December 2013, he went on loan to Aris to try and help them avoid relegation. He made his debut to his new team in an away loss from Levadiakos scoring two goals in a 4–3 defeat. He scored another goal before his loan finished. Unfortunately he couldn't help the side avoid relegation.

Panionios
On 28 January 2015, Bakasetas signed a two years' contract with Panionios for an undisclosed fee. He started the 2015–16 season with two goals in the opening three matches. On 17 October 2015, he scored the two goals of his club in a 2–0 home win against Kalloni.

AEK Athens
On 8 June 2016, Bakasetas signed a three-years contract with AEK Athens for an undisclosed fee. On 17 September 2016, he netted the first goal with the club in an away 2–0 win against Veria. On 9 April 2017, Bakasetas scored a brace in a 5–0 home win against Kerkyra.

On 10 September 2017, he scored his first goal of the 2017–18 season in a 4–0 home win against AEL. On 22 April 2018, Bakasetas scored twice against Levadiakos to secure their first Super League title since 1994.

On 10 January 2019, Bakasetas agreed to a contract extension with AEK until the summer of 2022.

Alanyaspor
On 14 June 2019, Bakasetas agreed to join Turkish Süper Lig club Alanyaspor for a fee estimated at €1,000,000. On 24 August 2019, he scored his first league goal for the club, in a 4–1 home win against Kasımpaşa. On 20 October 2019, he scored with a kick after an assist from Onur Bulut in a 5–2 home win game against Çaykur Rizespor. On 30 November 2019, Bakasetas was in superb form during the game against Ankaragücü in Alanya, hitting the target twice in a comfortable 5–0 triumph and has been included in the Team of the Week in the Turkish Süper Lig. On 18 January 2020, he scored with a kick, in a hammering 5–1 home win game against Kayserispor. On 2 February 2020, as the first half approached its climax, Bakasetas successfully connected with an accurate cross from Papiss Cissé, thumping a powerful header into the right corner. Alanyaspor, finishing the match with 10 men, subsequently claimed a 2–1 triumph against Yeni Malatyaspor at home. On 5 February 2020, he scored with a wonderful kick in a 2–0 Turkish Cup home win game against Galatasaray. On 22 June 2020, in the fifth minute of stoppage time against title challengers Trabzonspor at home, the 26-year-old attacking midfielder came to the rescue again for Alanyaspor, beating his opponent for skill before unleashing a powerful attempt which flew under the goalkeeper and into the net, in a 2–2 home draw game.

On mid September 2020, Fenerbahçe that has been the leader in the transfer window in the Süper Lig, is about to finish the transfer of Anastasios Bakasetas, which has been negotiating for a long time. According to various reports, Fenerbahçe and Alanyaspor reached the final stage in negotiations after long negotiations and got closer to the agreement. The Greek international midfielder, who played in all 34 league games, marked the season with 10 goals and 5 assists, also entered the radar of Italian clubs.

Trabzonspor
On 30 January 2021, Trabzonspor snap up Greek midfielder Bakasetas, who mainly operates as an attacking midfielder, had a previous stint in Turkey with Aytemiz Alanyaspor, racking up 21 goals and 12 assists in 64 appearances. On 4 February 2021, in his first appearance with the club, the Greek midfielder scored the winner at the 61st minute at Trabzon's Medical Park Stadium against Denizlispor.
On 16 August 2021, Bakasetas scored the first goal of the club for the season, in a hammering 5–1 away win against Yeni Malatyaspor. A week later he opened the score with a penalty kick in a 2–1 home win game against Sivasspor. On 18 September 2021, he scored with a wonderful kick after Anthony Nwakaeme's assist, sealing a vital 1–0 away win against Kasımpaşa S.K. On 2 October 2021, Trabzonspor defeated Kayserispor 2–1 in the 8th week of the Süper Lig, with both goals scored by the Greek international in a breathtaking match. On 17 October 2021, Bakasetas scored a brace in the victory of Trabzonspor against Fenerbahçe for the top derby of the Süper Lig.
On 6 November 2021, in a 2–1 away win against rivals Beşiktaş J.K., which established its club at the top of the League after 12 games, the 28-year-old midfielder received a hard tackle from Rachid Ghezzal in the 27th minute of the match, but even after the necessary medical assistance,  he was substituted in the first half, as he could not continue. The rehabilitation period was estimated at three weeks, according to medical reports. On 19 January 2022, Bakasetas was defeated twice by Okan Kocuk on a penalty kick and in the replay of the match between Trabzonspor and Giresunspor and could not give the victory to his club, but a week later he tied at 1–1 with a kick in a decisive away victory against Galatasaray in his club effort to win the championship.

International career
Bakasetas has represented his country at youth international level. He was selected in the Greece under-19s squad for the 2011 European Under-19 Football Championship along with Asteras Tripolis teammate Nikolaos Skondras.

He made his under-19 debut in one of the two opening games of the tournament, as a 55th-minute substitute in a 2–1 defeat against the Republic of Ireland under-19s on 20 July 2011. He made his first start in the second group game, a 1–0 victory against the Romania under-19s on 23 July 2011.

On 19 May 2016, was called up for the friendly matches against Australia on 4 and 7 June 2016. On 4 June 2016, he made his international debut as a substitute, in a 1–0 friendly loss against Australia, when Mathew Leckie scored with the final kick of the game to help the Socceroos beat Greece.

On 25 March 2021, Anastasios Bakasetas converted a goal from the spot to stun Luis Enrique's team and earn his side an impressive point in a 1–1 away draw for the 2022 World Cup qualifying campaign against Spain, as substitute Inigo Martinez conceded a penalty for a rash tackle on Greek midfielder Giorgos Masouras. On 8 September 2021, Anastasios Bakasetas gives Greece the lead in the 2nd half with a wonderful slalom after Anastasios Douvikas' assist, en route to giving Sweden their first loss (2–1) of 2022 World Cup qualifying.

Career statistics

Club

International
Scores and results list Greece's goal tally first.

Honours

Club
Asteras Tripolis
 Greek Cup runner-up: 2012–13

AEK Athens
 Super League Greece: 2017–18
 Greek Cup runner-up: 2016–17, 2017–18, 2018–19

Alanyaspor
 Turkish Cup runner-up: 2019–20

Trabzonspor
 Süper Lig: 2021–22
 Turkish Super Cup: 2022

International
Greece U19
UEFA European Under-19 Championship runner-up: 2012

Individual
Super League Greece Team of the Year: 2015–16
Best Greek Player playing Abroad: 2019–20, 2021–22
Super Lig  Attacking Midfielder of the Year: 2021–22

References

External links

 
 
 
 

1993 births
Living people
Greek footballers
Greek expatriate footballers
Expatriate footballers in Turkey
Greek expatriate sportspeople in Turkey
Greece youth international footballers
Greece under-21 international footballers
Greece international footballers
Association football forwards
Super League Greece players
Süper Lig players
Football League (Greece) players
Asteras Tripolis F.C. players
Thrasyvoulos F.C. players
Aris Thessaloniki F.C. players
Panionios F.C. players
AEK Athens F.C. players
Alanyaspor footballers
Trabzonspor footballers
Footballers from Corinth